Mahiro Takano (born 15 July 2006) is a Japanese karateka, six-times Japanese champion at the primary school level in the Kata discipline. In 2015, at the age of nine, she starred in the music video for Sia's song "Alive".

Biography 
Takano's hometown is Nagaoka, Niigata Prefecture.

References 

2006 births
Living people
Japanese female karateka
People from Niigata Prefecture
People from Nagaoka, Niigata
Sportspeople from Niigata Prefecture